Wartburg is a city in Morgan County, Tennessee, United States. The population was 918 at the 2010 census. It is the county seat of Morgan County.

History
In 1805, the Cherokee ceded what is now Morgan County to the United States by signing the Third Treaty of Tellico.  The first settlers arrived in the area shortly thereafter.
  
Wartburg was founded in the mid-1840s by George Gerding, a land speculator who bought up large tracts of land in what is now Morgan County and organized the East Tennessee Colonization Company with plans to establish a series of German colonies in the Cumberland region.  German and Swiss immigrants, seeking to escape poor economic conditions in their home counties, arrived at the site by traveling from New Orleans up the Mississippi and Cumberland rivers to Nashville, and then by ox cart to the Cumberland Plateau.  The first of these settlers arrived in the area in 1845, and new groups of immigrants would continue trickling in until 1855.

The new settlement, which had already been platted by East Tennessee Colonization Company agent Friedrich Guenther, was named after Wartburg Castle in Germany.  The first six streets were initially named for European cities, but the names were changed within a few years to Rose, Church, Maidenland (now Maiden), Kingston, Mill, and Cumberland.  As most immigrants lived on farms outside the town, Wartburg grew slowly.  By 1850, the town consisted of Gerding's house and store, a church and school building, a doctor's office, and a few small houses.  Early residents included a number of professionals trained in Europe, including architect Carl Rothe, musician Gustav Knabe, painter George Dury, and physicians Rudolf Knaffl and F. A. Sienknecht.

While Morgan County was generally pro-Union during the Civil War, Wartburg was bitterly divided over the secession issue.  Gerding, the city's founder, supported the Confederacy.  John Wilken, a prominent Lutheran pastor in the city, supported the Union.  F.A. Sienknecht supported the Union, though two of his sons fought for the Confederacy.  On January 2, 1862, a Confederate cavalry unit under Colonel J.W. White clashed with the Union Home Guard near Wartburg.  In late March 1862, Confederate General Kirby Smith reported that all Confederate citizens had been expelled from the Wartburg area.  In June 1863, Union General William P. Sanders marched through Wartburg and captured 104 Confederate soldiers in the vicinity.

In 1870, Morgan County elected to move its county seat from the now-defunct town of Montgomery, which had a population of just 50 residents and had been economically overshadowed by Wartburg.  A new courthouse, consisting of a simple frame structure, was completed in 1871.  The current Richardsonian Romanesque-style courthouse was built in 1904.

By the early 20th century, Wartburg had grown modestly, reporting a population of about 500 in 1920. At this time, the city included a bank, school, newspaper, four general stores, a clothing store, a hardware store, and a billiard hall.  In 1968, Wartburg voted to incorporate, and elected Roy McNeal as its mayor.

Geography

Wartburg is located at  (36.104244, -84.591817). The city is situated amidst the Crab Orchard Mountains, a sub-range of the Cumberland Mountains, near the eastern edge of the Cumberland Plateau. The Emory River, its source near the summit of Bird, flows westwardly along the mountain's northern base, passing just north of Wartburg, and turning south before dropping off the plateau and emptying into the Watts Bar Lake impoundment of the Tennessee River. The Obed River flows eastwardly from Cumberland County through a scenic gorge before emptying into the Emory just west of Wartburg.

Wartburg is situated around the junction of U.S. Route 27, which connects the city to Kentucky to the north and Harriman and Interstate 40 to the south, and State Route 62, which connects Wartburg to Oak Ridge to the east and the rural areas of Morgan County and Fentress County to the west.

Demographics

2020 census

As of the 2020 United States census, there were 848 people, 377 households, and 218 families residing in the city.

2000 census
As of the census of 2000, there were 890 people, 363 households, and 197 families residing in the city. The population density was 929.3 people per square mile (357.9/km2). There were 394 housing units at an average density of 411.4 per square mile (158.5/km2). The racial makeup of the city was 97.19% White, 0.67% African American, 0.11% Native American, 0.22% Asian, 0.11% from other races, and 1.69% from two or more races. Hispanic or Latino of any race were 1.46% of the population.

There were 363 households, out of which 29.2% had children under the age of 18 living with them, 35.5% were married couples living together, 16.0% had a female householder with no husband present, and 45.7% were non-families. 43.3% of all households were made up of individuals, and 21.2% had someone living alone who was 65 years of age or older. The average household size was 2.12 and the average family size was 2.95.

In the city, the population was spread out, with 23.0% under the age of 18, 7.3% from 18 to 24, 21.6% from 25 to 44, 20.4% from 45 to 64, and 27.6% who were 65 years of age or older. The median age was 42 years. For every 100 females, there were 72.8 males. For every 100 females age 18 and over, there were 62.3 males.

The median income for a household in the city was $19,722, and the median income for a family was $37,917. Males had a median income of $32,708 versus $22,143 for females. The per capita income for the city was $12,252. About 24.5% of families and 29.8% of the population were below the poverty line, including 39.1% of those under age 18 and 19.1% of those age 65 or over.

Recreation

Today, Wartburg is the headquarters for the Obed Wild and Scenic River (managed by the National Park Service), Frozen Head State Park, and Lone Mountain State Forest. The Catoosa Wildlife Management Area is located immediately to the west, and the Big South Fork National River and Recreation Area is located several miles to the north.

Notable residents

Joseph Knaffl (1861–1938), photographer

References

External links

 Municipal Technical Advisory Service entry for Wartburg — information on local government, elections, and link to charter

Cities in Morgan County, Tennessee
Cities in Tennessee
County seats in Tennessee
German-American culture in Tennessee
Swiss-American history